Drzewica  is a village in the administrative district of Gmina Bytnica, within Krosno Odrzańskie County, Lubusz Voivodeship, in western Poland. 

References

Drzewica